Carole Wells (born August 31, 1942) is an American actress, opera singer, producer and author.

Early years
The daughter of a doctor, Wells was born Carole Maureen Wells in Shreveport, Louisiana, the fourth of six children in her family. Her siblings were two brothers and three sisters. She graduated from Hollywood High School, where she was a sorority sister of future actress Linda Evans.

Stage
Wells began acting with a role in a play at a little theater in Burbank, California, when she was 12 years old.

Described as a light soprano, Wells took opera lessons in the 1960s and expanded her repertoire to musical theater, performing in "musical productions of The Sound of Music, Call Me Madam with Ethel Merman ... Wildcat with Martha Raye, and State Fair with Roger Smith."

Television and film work
Wells was selective with regard to working in television. She said: "There are certain things I don't want to do. I won't do a television series unless it's a real good one. You put too much into it for what you get out. It's hard to find a series that's good for a girl."

Wells played Edwina Brown in the NBC drama National Velvet (1960-1962) and Lucy Hanks in the CBS comedy Pistols 'n' Petticoats (1966-1967). She also was seen on The Brian Keith Show, Showcase 5 -- Something Special, Wagon Train, Police Woman,

She appeared in the television series Medic, Father Knows Best, Bachelor Father, Maverick in "The Lass with the Poisonous Air," Fury, The Donna Reed Show, The Many Loves of Dobie Gillis, Wide Country, Laramie, National Velvet, Wagon Train, Leave It to Beaver, Ben Casey, Arrest and Trial, Perry Mason, Pistols 'n' Petticoats, The Virginian, The Sixth Sense, The Brian Keith Show, Switch, McCloud, Police Woman and 1st & Ten, among others. She appeared in the films A Thunder of Drums, Come Blow Your Horn, The Lively Set, Zorro in the Court of England, The House of Seven Corpses, Funny Lady and The Cheap Detective.

Books
 Amberella: An Action Hero Adventure
 Hijacked: An Eyewitness Account of Evil (MotherBird Productions, 14 September 2018,

Other work
Wells is partnered with Bemer Group, a manufacturer of devices that boost blood circulation.

Personal life
Wells married Edward Laurence Doheny IV in June 1963. Doheny was an "oil scion," the great grandson of Edward Laurence Doheny, the first man to successfully drill an oil well in the Los Angeles City Oil Field. They had two sons.

Later she married Walter J. Karabian, a member of the California House of Representatives. They had a son and a daughter.

In 1977, while she and Karabian were on an "around the world honeymoon", a Japan Airlines flight on which they were traveling (Japan Airlines Flight 472) was hijacked by Japanese terrorists who asked for a ransom of $6 million and release of nine terrorists from jail. After being released, Wells described the hijacking as "a terrible experience." She was pregnant at the time and later suffered a miscarriage, which her husband attributed to the trauma of the hijacking.

References

External links
 
 Blogspot: The Carole Wells Show
 Hollywood High School Alumni Association: Carole Wells's Page
 On Purpose Magazine: Actress Carole Wells On Her Career and New Children's Book Amberella
 The SOP: Women It is Time to Stand Up for Our Children Against Terror and Slavery

1942 births
Living people
20th-century American actresses
American film actresses
Actors from Shreveport, Louisiana
Writers from Shreveport, Louisiana
21st-century American women